Zhang Zhejia (born ) is a Chinese male volleyball player. He is part of the China men's national volleyball team. On club level he plays for Shanghai.

Awards

Clubs
 2013 National Games of China -  Runner-Up, with Shanghai Junior
 2013–2014 Chinese Volleyball League -  Runner-Up, with Shanghai
 2014–2015 Chinese Volleyball League -  Champion, with Shanghai
 2015–2016 Chinese Volleyball League -  Champion, with Shanghai
 2016–2017 Chinese Volleyball League -  Champion, with Shanghai
 2017–2018 Chinese Volleyball League -  Champion, with Shanghai
 2018–2019 Chinese Volleyball League -  Champion, with Shanghai

Individuals
 2013 FIVB Volleyball Boys' U19 World Championship "Best Middle Blocker"
 2015 Asian Men's Volleyball Championship "Best Middle Blocker"
 2015 FIVB Volleyball Men's U21 World Championship "Best Middle Blocker"

References

External links
 profile at FIVB.org

1995 births
Living people
Chinese men's volleyball players
Volleyball players at the 2018 Asian Games
Asian Games competitors for China
21st-century Chinese people